Sparganothis directana, the chokecherry leafroller moth, is a species of moth of the family Tortricidae. It is found in North America from Ontario to Florida, west to Texas and Michigan.

The wingspan is about 20 mm. The forewings are dull orange with dull reddish lines. The hindwings are light yellowish orange. Adults are on wing from June to August.

The larvae feed on the leaves of Prunus virginiana.

References

Moths described in 1863
Sparganothis